The third season of Sex and the City, an American television romantic comedy-drama, aired in the United States on HBO from June 4 to October 15, 2000. Based on the eponymous book written by Candace Bushnell, the series was created by Darren Star and produced by Darren Star Productions, HBO Original Programming, and Warner Bros. Television. Star, Barry Josen and Michael Patrick King served as the series' executive producers. The show follows the relationships and sexual escapades of Carrie Bradshaw, a sex columnist for the fictional New York Star, and her friends Samantha Jones, Charlotte York and Miranda Hobbes.

Season three saw a more serialized approach to the series. Carrie begins dating Aidan Shaw, a furniture craftsman who stands as a polar opposite to Mr. Big, who struggles in his marriage to Natasha as well as seeing Carrie with someone else. Miranda and Steve move in with each other but find themselves going in different directions in terms of maturity. Charlotte dates and later marries Trey McDougal, who turns out to be impotent. 

Season three, comprising 18 episodes, aired on Sunday nights at 9:00 p.m. Eastern Time Zone. The third season saw a rise in ratings from the previous season, averaging a total of nine million viewers. The show garnered acclaim in its third season, winning the Best Comedy Series awards at the Primetime Emmy Awards and Golden Globe Awards and the Screen Actors Guild Award for Outstanding Performance by an Ensemble in a Comedy Series.

Production
The third season of Sex and the City was created by Darren Star and produced by Darren Star Productions and Warner Bros. Television, in association with HBO Original Programming. The series is based on the book of the same name, written by Candace Bushnell, which contains stories from her column with the New York Observer. The show features production from Barry Jossen, Michael Patrick King, and Star. Season three featured writing credits from Star, King, Jenny Bicks, Cindy Chupack, Becky Hartman Edwards, and Allan Heinberg. The season was directed by Dan Algrant, Allison Anders, John David Coles, Allan Coulter, Dennis Erdman, Nicole Holofcener, Charles McDougall, Michael Spiller, and Pam Thomas.

Cast and characters

Season three featured four actors receiving star billing. Sarah Jessica Parker played the lead character Carrie Bradshaw, a writer of a sex column, "Sex and the City", for a fictional magazine and the narrator of the series. Kim Cattrall portrayed Samantha Jones, a sexually confident public relations agent who follows the same relationship rules that men do. Kristin Davis played Charlotte York, an optimistic art museum curator who holds traditional views on relationships. Cynthia Nixon portrayed Miranda Hobbes, an acerbic lawyer with a pessimistic outlook on relationships and a distrust of men.

The season featured a number of recurring guest appearances. Chris Noth reprises his role as Mr. Big, who is currently married to Natasha Naginsky (Bridget Moynahan). Willie Garson portrayed Carrie's gay best friend and talent manager Stanford Blatch. David Eigenberg appears as Steve Brady, a bartender and Miranda's love interest. John Corbett played Aidan Shaw, a laid-back furniture designer who becomes Carrie's long-term boyfriend. Kyle MacLachlan of Twin Peaks fame joined the series portraying Charlotte's boyfriend and later husband Trey MacDougal, a cardiologist from a wealthy family whose marriage to Charlotte is plagued by his impotence and his intruding mother. Frances Sternhagen recurred during the season as Trey's mother Bunny.

Reception

Sex and the City received various awards and nominations during its third season. At the 58th Golden Globe Awards, the series received four nominations, winning two for Best Television Series – Musical or Comedy and Best Actress – Television Series Musical or Comedy, awarded to Sarah Jessica Parker. Kim Cattrall and Cynthia Nixon received their second nominations for Best Supporting Actress – Series, Miniseries or Television Film. At the 53rd Primetime Emmy Awards, the show received ten nominations, including a third nomination for Outstanding Lead Actress in a Comedy Series for Parker and a second nomination for Outstanding Supporting Actress in a Comedy Series for Cattrall. The series won the award for Outstanding Comedy Series.

At the 7th Screen Actors Guild Awards, Cattrall and Parker received nominations for Outstanding Performance by a Female Actor in a Comedy Series while the cast won the award for Outstanding Performance by an Ensemble in a Comedy Series. The show also won Best Television Series – Musical or Comedy at the 6th Golden Satellite Awards, while receiving nominations for Outstanding Achievement in Comedy at the 17th TCA Awards, the  Award for Television: Episodic Comedy at the 53rd WGA Awards for episodes "Attack of the 5' 10" Woman" (written by Cindy Chupack) and "Ex and the City" (written by Michael Patrick King), and Outstanding Directing – Comedy Series at the 53rd Directors Guild of America Awards for "Cock a Doodle Do!" (directed by Allen Coulter), among others.

Episodes

Home media

References

2000 American television seasons
Sex and the City